Brooks is an unincorporated community in Central Arkansas about four miles east of Bauxite on Arkansas Route 111 in Saline County, Arkansas, United States.

References

Unincorporated communities in Saline County, Arkansas
Unincorporated communities in Arkansas
Populated places in Central Arkansas